Haunhar Lalmuankima (born 5 July 1995) is an Indian professional footballer who plays as a forward for Chanmari FC.

Career
Born in Mizoram, Lalmuankima played for both Luangmual and Chanmari before joining Aizawl. He made his professional debut for Aizawl in the I-League on 13 February 2016 against Shillong Lajong. He started the match and 89 minutes as the match ended 0–0. He was awarded the Best Forward of 2017 in the Mizoram Premier League.

On 10 January 2018, he joined FC Goa.

Career statistics

References

External links 
 Aizawl Football Club Profile.
 ZoFooty Profile.

1991 births
Living people
Indian footballers
Chanmari FC players
Aizawl FC players
Association football midfielders
Footballers from Mizoram
Mizoram Premier League players
I-League players